The Nord 2.821 to 2.911 and 2.201 to 2.212, also referred to as Outrances, was a series of French  and  express passenger locomotives of the Chemins de Fer du Nord.

Construction history

The first series, Nord 2.821–2.832, designed by L. Beugniot as  locomotives, was built by André Koechlin & Cie in Mulhouse in 1870–1871.
The firebox had an arced top and sat between the two driving axles.
The dome was placed centrally on top of the firebox and a Crampton-type steam regulator was placed on the extreme front of the first boiler shell. 
The cylinders were installed horizontally without inclination inside of the frame and had a Stephenson valve gear.

In 1873 Édouard Delebecque modified the design. A Belpaire firebox which extended over the rear driving axle was installed.
A single machine, the Nord 2.833, was built in 1873.

From 1875 to 1877 the next series, Nord 2.834–2.860, was built by the Société Alsacienne de Constructions Mécaniques (SACM) at Mulhouse with only minor differences.
The dome was moved forward to the rear end of the second boiler shell, just in front of the firebox.
Also a three-axle tender of  water and  coal, weighing , was used.

In the following series, Nord 2.861–2.911, which was built in 1877–1879, the leading axle was replaced by a 2-axle bogie pivoting around a fixed point in the frame.

The last series was built in the years 1884 to 1885 and comprised the twelve locomotives Nord 2.201–2.212, which had a leading radial axle instead of the 2-axle bogie.

Over time various modifications were done on the machines.
All machines with a single leading axle received leading 2-axle bogies with lateral movement, the Nord 2.821–2.833 in 1890–1892, the Nord 2.834–2.860 in 1894–1898 and the Nord 2.201–2.212 in 1891–1892.

References

Bibliography

External links

 ETH-Bibliothek Zürich, Bildarchiv. Nord 2.822, André Koechlin & Cie (1870), viewer
 ETH-Bibliothek Zürich, Bildarchiv. Nord 2.836, SACM No. 2383 (1875), viewer
 ETH-Bibliothek Zürich, Bildarchiv. Nord 2.879, SACM No. 2752 (1879), viewer

Steam locomotives of France
2.821
2-4-0 locomotives
4-4-0 locomotives
Railway locomotives introduced in 1870
1B n2 locomotives
2′B n2 locomotives
1′B n2 locomotives
SACM locomotives
Passenger locomotives